Abkosh Rural District is in Bord Khun District of Deyr County, Bushehr province, Iran. At the census of 2006, its population was 3,954 in 776 households; there were 4,222 inhabitants in 1,034 households at the following census of 2011; and in the most recent census of 2016, the population of the rural district was 4,352 in 1,170 households. The largest of its nine villages was Shahniya, with 2,070 people.

References 

Rural Districts of Bushehr Province
Populated places in Deyr County